Steve Wilson is the state senator for the 7th District of the Ohio Senate. He is a Republican. The district covers Warren County, a portion of Butler County including half of Middletown and a portion of Hamilton County including Indian Hill and parts of Cincinnati and Loveland.

Life and career
Wilson received a B.A. in finance from Miami University in 1972, and served  in the United States Navy as a Lieutenant (Junior Grade). After his service in the Navy, Wilson started in an entry level teller position at Lebanon Citizens National Bank (LCNB), rising to serve as the CEO of both LCNB Corp. and Lebanon Citizens National Bank. Wilson continues to serve on the board of LCNB. While leading LCNB Wilson expanded it from serving two local communities to over 30 throughout nine Ohio counties. 

He formerly was the chair of the American Bankers Association, chair of the Ohio Bankers Association, president of Warren County Chamber of Commerce, vice-chair of Otterbein Senior Life, and has served as a board member of the Federal Reserve Bank of Cleveland.

Wilson also previously served on the board of trustees for his alma mater, Miami University. His first entrance into elected office was as a School Board member, and later President for Lebanon City School District. Wilson is heavily involved in the local community, currently serving on the boards of Countryside YMCA, the Warren County Foundation, the Warren County Port Authority, the American Automobile Association (AAA) Allied Group, Area Progress Council, and the Harmon Civic Trust.

Senator Wilson is a prolific fundraiser for local civic organisations and nonprofits; leading a $4 million campaign for the Countryside YMCA's expansion to become the largest YMCA in the world, a capital campaign for the Ohio Historical Society that resulted in the creation of the Gateway Visitors Center at Fort Ancient, chairing a committee for Otterbein Senior Life Community that raised $3.1 million to create its Life Enrichment Center, and serving as co-chair of the capital campaign to create the Warren County Foundation.

Wilson has been named Citizen of the Year by the Lebanon Chamber of Commerce and inducted into both the Butler County and Cincinnati Magazine's Business Hall of Fame. Wilson was awarded for his philanthropic efforts with the George Henkle Award from the Warren County Foundation. He is also a member of the Governor appointed Executive Order of The Ohio Commodore, which is considered Ohio’s “most distinguished honor.”.

Wilson resides in Maineville, Ohio. He is married with four children and five grandchildren.
He is an active member of Otterbein United Methodist Church.

Ohio Senate
In 2016, Senator Shannon Jones who had served in the Senate since 2009, announced that she would forgo her last two years before being term-limited to run for county commissioner in Warren County. Winning that seat, she resigned from the Senate effective December 31, 2016, prior to the beginning of the new General Assembly.

It was announced that Wilson would receive the appointment on January 13, 2017, and that he would be seated soon after. On January 25, 2017, Wilson was sworn in to complete the remainder of the term, and will have to seek election to his own term in 2018. Senator Wilson was elected in 2018 to serve a 4-year term. In his campaign, Wilson's margin of victory was 22% points, winning 62% of the vote.

Wilson currently serves as the Chairman of the Ohio Senate Financial Institutions & Technology  Committee. He also serves on the Energy & Public Utilities Committee, Insurance Committee, and Veterans & Public Safety Committee.

Steve Wilson's legislative accomplishments include harsher penalties on public officials convicted of theft, streamlining access to certifications necessary for in-demand jobs, and improving the state trail network in Warren County. Senator Wilson has received perfect scores for his work and voting record from the Ohio Chamber of Commerce and the American Conservative Union. Senator Wilson has been awarded for his efforts in the Ohio Statehouse, including by the County Treasurers Association of Ohio, the Ohio's Public Service Award from LeadingAge, and two awards for "Conservative Excellence" from the American Conservative Union.

Senator Wilson is a lifelong Republican and a member of the Warren County Republican Party Executive Committee.

References

External links
 Ohio State Representative Steve Wilson official site

Living people
Miami University alumni
21st-century American politicians
Republican Party Ohio state senators
People from Warren County, Ohio
Year of birth missing (living people)